The 2006 Davidoff Swiss Indoors was a men's tennis tournament played on indoor carpet courts. It was the 37th edition of the event known that year as the Davidoff Swiss Indoors, and was part of the International Series of the 2006 ATP Tour. It took place at the St. Jakobshalle in Basel, Switzerland, from 23 October through 29 October 2006.

The announced singles field featured World No. 1, Australian Open, Wimbledon and US Open champion, recent Tokyo titlist, Basel boy Roger Federer, Australian Open and French Open semifinalist, Estoril winner David Nalbandian, and Madrid Masters and Vienna runner-up Fernando González. Also lined up were Halle and Mumbai finalist Tomáš Berdych, Stuttgart winner David Ferrer, Andy Murray, José Acasuso and Agustín Calleri.

Finals

Singles

 Roger Federer defeated  Fernando González, 6–3, 6–2, 7–6(7–3)
It was Roger Federer's 11th title of the year, and his 44th overall.

Doubles

 Mark Knowles /  Daniel Nestor defeated  Mariusz Fyrstenberg /  Marcin Matkowski, 4–6, 6–4, [10–8]

References

External links

Official website
Singles draw
Doubles draw
Qualifying Singles draw

 
Davidoff Swiss Indoors
2006